Marie Lyn Bernard (born 1981), known professionally as Riese Bernard, is an American writer and digital media executive. She is best known as the CEO and co-founder of the lesbian and queer women's interest website Autostraddle. Bernard received a 2017 GLAAD Media Award nomination for her article, “105 Trans Women On American TV: A History and Analysis”.

Early life and education  
Bernard was born and raised in Michigan. Her father, Victor L. Bernard, a scholar, researcher and professor in the field of financial statement analysis, died of a heart attack when she was 14 years old. Her mother came out to her as gay shortly after her father's death.

She graduated from Interlochen Arts Academy in 1999 with a major in Creative Writing. After graduating from University of Michigan with a bachelor's degree in English in 2003, she moved to New York City to pursue a career in writing.

Career 
In 2007, Bernard created The Road Best Straddled, a spin-off of her personal blog This Girl Called Automatic Win, to recap The L Word, then in its fourth season. This led to collaborations with The L Word Online and Showtime and her blogs gained sizeable followings. She also interned at the now-defunct website Nerve and worked for the Donald Maass Literary Agency.

Bernard has published writing in Marie Claire, Curve, GO, Queerty, Bitch, Jezebel and Emily Books. Her article “105 Trans Women On American TV: A History and Analysis” was nominated for a 2017 GLAAD Media Award. In 2018, Bernard's profile of Hayley Kiyoko was the cover story for Nylon's first-ever Pride Issue.

Autostraddle 

At the end of the final season of The L Word in 2009, she created Autostraddle.com with her then-girlfriend Alex Vega, with the intention of creating a digital website focused on gay women. Bernard stated she was inspired to create the website because nothing else like it existed at the time. The website received a GLAAD Media Award in 2015 and receives 4 million unique page views per month. In 2012, she created A-Camp, an annual 5-day "curated conference/camp/retreat combo" for queer women and trans people, located in Ojai, California.

Personal life 
Bernard first began to identify as a bisexual, and then as a lesbian, in her twenties. Bernard is Jewish.

Accolades 

 2010 – 100 Women We Love, GO 
2011 – 100 Women We Love, GO
2016 – 100 Women We Love, GO
 2017 – GLAAD Media Award (nomination), GLAAD 
 2018 – Queero, Them

References

External links 
Official website

1981 births
Living people
Jewish American writers
21st-century American businesspeople
American women chief executives
Writers from Michigan
American online publication editors
American lesbian writers
University of Michigan College of Literature, Science, and the Arts alumni
Lesbian feminists
LGBT people from Michigan
LGBT Jews
American technology chief executives
American women non-fiction writers
21st-century American businesswomen
Interlochen Center for the Arts alumni
21st-century American Jews